Hell, titled Torment in the USA, is a 1994 French drama film directed by Claude Chabrol. It was adapted by Chabrol from the screenplay by Henri-Georges Clouzot for the unfinished film L'Enfer, which Clouzot began shooting in 1964 but was unable to complete. The producer of Chabrol's film was Marin Karmitz and the leading actors were Emmanuelle Béart and François Cluzet.

Plot summary
Paul (Cluzet) and Nelly (Béart) are a married couple who run a successful hotel. Paul begins to suspect Nelly of being unfaithful, and eventually descends into paranoia from which there is no escape. Instead of the usual final caption, "The End", L'Enfer finishes on a caption that reads "Without end..."

Cast 
 Emmanuelle Béart as Nelly
 François Cluzet as Paul Prieur
 Nathalie Cardone as Marylin
 André Wilms as Doctor Arnoux
 Marc Lavoine as Martineau
 Christiane Minazzoli as Mme Vernon
 Dora Doll as Mme Chabert
 Mario David as Duhamel
 Jean-Pierre Cassel as M. Vernon
 Thomas Chabrol as Julien
  as M. Chabert
 Yves Verhoeven as Young Boy

Year-end lists 
 Honorable mention –  Glenn Lovell, San Jose Mercury News

References

External links

1994 films
1994 drama films
French drama films
1990s French-language films
Films directed by Claude Chabrol
Adultery in films
Films produced by Marin Karmitz
Films with screenplays by Henri-Georges Clouzot
1990s French films